The Southeastern Conference Pitcher of the Year is a college softball award given to the Southeastern Conference's most outstanding pitcher. The award has been given annually since 2002.

Monica Abbott of Tennessee has the won the award a record three times. The award was shared twice: in 2005 between Monica Abbott and Michelle Green and in 2021 between Montana Fouts and Mary Haff.

Winners

Winners by  School

References

Awards established in 2002
Player
NCAA Division I softball conference players of the year